William J. Rutter (born August 28, 1928) is an American biochemist who cofounded the early biotechnology company Chiron Corporation together with Edward Penhoet and Pablo DT Valenzuela.  As Chairman of the Department of Biochemistry and Biophysics of the University of California, San Francisco, Rutter helped establish that department as a leader in the academic side of the biotechnology during the San Francisco Bay Area biotech boom of the 1980s.

Rutter spent a short time in the United States Navy and one year Brigham Young University, before completing a B.A. (1949) in biochemistry at Harvard University.  He earned an M.S. (1950) from University of Utah and a PhD (1952) from the University of Illinois with a dissertation on galactosemia.  Between 1952 and 1968, Rutter held positions at the University of Wisconsin, the Karolinska Institutet, University of Illinois, Stanford University, and University of Washington.  In 1969, he moved to the University of California, San Francisco (UCSF), where he led the Department of Biochemistry and Biophysics until 1982.  From 1983 until 1989, Rutter was Director of the Hormone Research Institute at UCSF.

In 1996, Rutter won the 2nd Annual Heinz Awards in Technology, the Economy and Employment and in 2003, he received the Biotechnology Heritage Award, from the Biotechnology Industry Organization (BIO) and the Chemical Heritage Foundation.

References

External links
William J. Rutter Papers, MSS 94-54, Archives & Special Collections, UCSF Library & CKM

1928 births
Living people
American biochemists
Biotechnologists
Brigham Young University alumni
Harvard University alumni
University of Utah alumni
University of Wisconsin–Madison faculty
University of Illinois Urbana-Champaign faculty
Stanford University Department of Biology faculty
University of California, San Francisco faculty
Members of the United States National Academy of Sciences